Porphyrocrates is a genus of moths of the family Yponomeutidae.

Species
Porphyrocrates aurostricta - Diakonoff, 1955 

Yponomeutidae